Thomas James Wade (August 4, 1893 – June 11, 1969) was a Roman Catholic bishop.

Born in Providence, Rhode Island, United States, Wade was ordain a priest on June 15, 1922, for the Society of Mary. On July 3, 1930, Wade was appointed bishop for the Vicariate Apostolic of Northern Solomon Islands, Papua New Guinea, and auxiliary bishop of Barbalissus. Wade was ordained bishop on October 14, 1930; he resigned on June 14, 1960.

As the first native English speaking Catholic bishop in the Pacific missions, Wade was able to secure strong support from Australia and the United States and his mission was successful despite major disruption during the Japanese occupation.

Notes

1893 births
1969 deaths
Clergy from Providence, Rhode Island
American Roman Catholic missionaries
20th-century Roman Catholic bishops in Oceania
Roman Catholic bishops of Bougainville
20th-century American clergy